Iram Dewitt Lewis (born 3 May 1965) is a Bahamian Free National Movement politician and former sprinter who has been the Member of Parliament (MP) for Central Grand Bahama since 2017. He became the president of the Grand Bahama Amateur Athletic Association in 2015. He was appointed Minister of Youth, Sports and Culture in March 2021.

He participated in the 1996 Summer Olympics and the 2000 Summer Olympics as a member of the men's 4 × 100 m relay team. They advanced through their first heat and into the semifinals in 1996 but did not do this in 2000. Lewis' personal best 100m time is 10.20, set in 1988 (Tuskegee University) 9.95 (wind-aided Fl.) 200m 20.64 1998 Nassau.

Early life
Lewis was born in Freeport, Grand Bahama. He is the son of the Reverend Aram Lewis. He attended Water Cay All Age School, where he was made Head Boy, and then Freeport High School. He pursued an Associate of Arts at the College of the Bahamas before going on to graduate with a Bachelor of Arts then a graduate degree, Bachelor of Architecture from Tuskegee University.

Personal life
Lewis lost his son in 2015.

References

Living people
1965 births
Athletes (track and field) at the 1994 Commonwealth Games
Athletes (track and field) at the 1995 Pan American Games
Athletes (track and field) at the 1996 Summer Olympics
Athletes (track and field) at the 2000 Summer Olympics
Bahamian male sprinters
Bahamian sportsperson-politicians
Commonwealth Games competitors for the Bahamas
Free National Movement politicians
Government ministers of the Bahamas
Members of the House of Assembly of the Bahamas
Olympic athletes of the Bahamas
Pan American Games competitors for the Bahamas
Tuskegee University alumni
University of the Bahamas alumni
World Athletics Championships athletes for the Bahamas